Halocynthia igaboja, commonly known as the sea hedgehog, the bristly tunicate or spiny sea squirt, is a species of tunicate in the family Pyuridae. It is native to the northeastern Pacific Ocean. This species was first described in 1906 by the Japanese marine biologist Asajiro Oka, who gave it the name Cynthia ritteri. It was later transferred to the genus Halocynthia.

Description
Solitary tunicates like the sea hedgehog have a roughly globular body with a leathery body wall or tunic, and two siphons. The buccal siphon draws water into the body, and the atrial siphon expels water. In this species, the tunic is dark brown but is rendered almost invisible by the numerous large, branching, spine-like processes which cover it. The longest spines bear rings of recurved secondary spines. The siphons are often reddish or orangish in colour; the buccal siphon is at the top of the animal and is surrounded by twelve to fifty tentacles, while the atrial siphon is a third to half of the way down the body. It could be confused with the cactus sea squirt (Boltenia echinata) but is altogether spinier and larger.

Distribution and habitat
The sea hedgehog is found in Japan, southeastern Asia, and the Pacific Coast of North America, from Alaska to California.

Ecology
The sea hedgehog is a suspension feeder, drawing water through its body and filtering out the plankton and organic material. Detritus and diatoms tend to accumulate on the spiny processes when the current is weak, rendering the animal almost invisible. The spines act as a defence against the Oregon hairy triton, a gastropod mollusc. The bristly sea squirt Boltenia villosa, lives in the same habitat but is less spiny; it defends itself by becoming an epibiont and preferentially settling on the spines of the sea hedgehog. This species is a semi-gregarious species and is cannibalistic, consuming its own eggs and larvae.

References

Stolidobranchia
Animals described in 1906